Bazel is a village in Belgium.

Bazel may also refer to:
 Bazel (software), an open source build tool initially created by Google

See also 
 De Bazel
 Bezel (disambiguation)
 Basel (disambiguation)